Trichilia rubescens is a species of plant in the family Meliaceae. It is native from Nigeria to northwest Tanzania.

References 

rubescens